Neduba is a genus of insects in the family Tettigoniidae (katydids), which is native to North America.

Species
The following species (1 extinct) belong to the genus Neduba:
 Neduba carinata F. Walker, 1869 i c g - type species
 Neduba castanea (Scudder, 1899) i c g
 Neduba convexa Caudell, 1907 i c g b
 Neduba diabolica (Scudder, 1899) i c g b
 Neduba macneilli Rentz & Birchim, 1968 i c g b (Macneill's shieldback)
 Neduba morsei Caudell, 1907 i
 Neduba propsti Rentz & Weissmann, 1981 i b (Catalina shield-back cricket)
 Neduba sierranus (Rehn & Hebard, 1911) i c g b (sierra shieldback)
 Neduba steindachneri (Herman, 1874) i c g b (Steindachner's shieldback)
Neduba extincta Rentz, 1977 i c g
Data sources: i = ITIS, c = Catalogue of Life, g = GBIF, b = Bugguide.net

References

Tettigoniinae
Tettigoniidae genera
Taxonomy articles created by Polbot